Mosquito Pass, with an elevation of , is a high mountain pass in the Mosquito Range of central Colorado in the United States. It lies on the boundary between Lake and Park counties between Leadville (west) and Fairplay (east). It also lies on the divide between the Arkansas and South Platte Rivers, which is the informal demarcation between the northern and southern parts of Colorado, east of the Continental Divide.

One of the highest passes in the state, Mosquito Pass can be traversed only on foot, on an offroad motorcycle or with a proper four-wheel drive (4WD) vehicle. 2WD vehicles will find the road difficult due to the stream crossings and high rocky sections. Even with 4WD, it is typically passable only during the summer months.

References

External links
The world's most dangerous and spectacular roads

Mountain passes of Colorado
Landforms of Lake County, Colorado
Landforms of Park County, Colorado
Transportation in Lake County, Colorado
Transportation in Park County, Colorado